The 1st Engineer Regiment is an inactive military engineer unit of the Italian Army, which was last based in Trento in Trentino. Founded in 1848 it is the oldest engineer regiment of the Italian Army.

History 
In 1848 the Sappers Regiment was formed in Alessandria. The regiment consisted of a staff and two battalions, each of which fielded four sappers companies and one miners company. Immediately after its founding the regiment's companies were deployed in the First Italian War of Independence. In 1853 the regiment formed a Provisional Sappers Battalion with four sappers companies for the Sardinian expeditionary corps in the Crimean War.

In 1859 the regiment's companies participated in the Second Italian War of Independence. In September 1859 the regiment consisted of four battalions. On 2 May 1860 the regiment received two sappers companies from the army of the Grand Duchy of Tuscany and eight sappers companies from the army of the Royal Provinces of Emilia, which had both been integrated into the Royal Sardinian Army. As a consequence the regiment was split and the 2nd Sappers Regiment was formed in Piacenza. The regiment itself was renamed 1st Sappers Regiment and now consisted of a staff, a depot, and three battalions, with four sappers companies per battalion.

The regiment's companies participated in the invasion of the Kingdom of the Two Sicilies following Giuseppe Garibaldi's Expedition of the Thousand. During the invasion the regiment's companies participated in the Siege of Gaeta, the siege of Messina, and the siege of Civitella del Tronto. After the annexation of the Kingdom of the Two Sicilies the regiment provided troops for the suppression of the popular revolt in Southern Italy in 1860–70.

In 1866 the regiment participated in the Third Italian War of Independence with its companies fighting in the Battle of Custoza and at Borgoforte. In 1867 the regiment was merged with the 2nd Sappers Regiment to form the Sappers Corps, which had its headquarters in Casale Monferrato and consisted of 28 sappers companies. In 1870 the 1st, 2nd, 4th, 10th, and 25th sappers companies participated in the capture of Rome.

On 1 January 1874 the corps was split and in Pavia the staff and depot of the 1st Artillery Regiment (Pontieri) were used to reform the 1st Engineer Regiment. The regiment received from the disbanded Sappers Corps 14 sappers companies and one Ferrovieri companies. The regiment also received four Pontieri companies, and two train companies from the 1st Artillery Regiment (Pontieri). In 1877 the regiment raised a second Ferrovieri company.

In 1883 the regiment provided four Pontieri companies, three telegraphists companies, two Ferrovieri companies, two train companies, and two sappers companies for the formation of the 3rd Engineer Regiment and 4th Engineer Regiment. In 1895 the regiment provided six sappers companies for the formation of the 5th Engineer Regiment and dispatched 7 officers and 298 enlisted for the First Italo-Ethiopian War. On 1 November 1895 the regiment was renamed 1st Engineer Regiment (Sappers) and consisted now of a staff, four sappers brigades, two train companies, and a depot. Each of the four brigades consisted of three sappers companies. In 1910 the brigades were renamed battalions. During the Italo-Turkish War of 1911-12 the regiment's I Battalion and III Battalion and two army corps engineer parks were deployed to Libya. In 1912 the regiment raised a fifth sappers battalion.

World War I 
During World War I battalions and companies raised by the regiment fought in all sectors of the Italian front. In total the regiment formed 37 sappers battalion commands and 114 sappers companies, nine flamethrowers companies, one firefighters company, 40 bridge sections, 35 divisional telephone sections, four telephone sections for alpine groups, three gas launcher sections, one wheel launcher section, four territorial militia battalion commands and 19 territorial militia companies, and 15 army corps engineer parks.

After the war the regiment was disbanded on 31 March 1920 and its personnel used to form a sappers battalion and a telegraphers battalion for each army corps on 1 April 1920.

On 15 November 1926 the regiment was reformed in Vercelli and consisted of a command, a sappers-miners battalion, a telegraphers battalion, a cableway battalion, a depot and five dovecotes (in Turin, Novara, Fenestrelle, Susa, and Aosta). On 1 February 1931 the Cableway Battalion was reorganized as Miners-Cableway Battalion and transferred on 28 October 1932 to the newly formed 1st Miners Regiment in Novi Ligure. On the same day the regiment received the III Battalion of the disbanded 2nd Radio-Telegraphers Regiment.

For the Second Italo-Ethiopian War the regiment formed the 64th Engineer Company, 26th Connections Company, 26th Water Platoon, 9th Photo-Electricians Section, and 11th Photo-Electricians Section. In 1936 the regiment moved from Vercelli to Turin and in January 1937 the telegraphers and radio-telegraphers battalions were renamed connections battalions.

World War II 
With the outbreak of World War II the regiment's depot began to mobilize new units:

 Command of the 1st Engineer Grouping
 I Mixed Engineer Battalion (for the 1st Alpine Division "Taurinense")
 XI Mixed Engineer Battalion (for the 6th Alpine Division "Alpi Graie")
 CI Mixed Engineer Battalion (for the 1st Infantry Division "Superga")
 VI Engineer Battalion
 IX Engineer Battalion
 I Telegraphers Battalion
 and many smaller units

On 30 December 1940 1st Engineer Grouping was sent to Albania. Upon arrival the grouping was renamed Armed Forces Albania Engineer Grouping and participated in the Greco-Italian War. On 1 February 1941 the grouping was renamed back to 1st Engineer Grouping. On 30 April 1942 the grouping was disbanded and its units joined the 4th Engineer Grouping, which had been formed by the 10th Engineer Regiment.

The 2nd Engineer Regiment was disbanded by invading German forces after the announcement of the Armistice of Cassibile on 8 September 1943.

1st Miners Regiment 
On 28 October 1932 the 1st Miners Regiment was formed in Novi Ligure. The regiment consisted of a command and three miners battalions, which had been transferred from the 1st Engineer Regiment, 2nd Engineer Regiment, and 3rd Engineer Regiment. The regiment's command and depot were formed with personnel from the disbanded 2nd Radio-Telegraphers Regiment, while the three miners battalions were transferred from the 1st Engineer Regiment, 2nd Engineer Regiment, and 3rd Engineer Regiment.

During World War II the regiment's depot mobilized the I, II, III, IV, IX, XI, and CIII miners battalions, as well as the XV and XVI engineer battalions. The regiment was disbanded by invading German forces after the announcement of the Armistice of Cassibile on 8 September 1943.

Cold War 
On 1 March 1950 the 1st Engineer Regiment was reformed Civitavecchia. The regiment consisted of a command and two training battalions. In June 1951 one of the two training battalions was disbanded. The remaining training battalion trained the personnel of the Engineer Battalion "Friuli" and Engineer Battalion "Granatieri di Sardegna". On 1 April 1954 the regiment was renamed 1st Engineer Grouping and consisted now of the IV, VII, and XX engineer battalions, the 1st and 2nd cableway companies, and a depot. The same year the regiment moved from Civitavecchia to Trento and was assigned to the IV Army Corps. On 1 April 1955 the grouping was renamed 1st Engineer Regiment and on 1 July 1955 the IV Engineer Battalion was transferred to the 2nd Engineer Regiment. The regiment now consisted of the following units:

  1st Engineer Regiment, in Trento
 Command Platoon, in Trento
 VII Engineer Battalion, in Riva del Garda
 XX Engineer Battalion, in Trento
 1st Cableway Company, in Trento
 2nd Cableway Company, in Trento
 1st Mechanics-Electricians Company, in Trento
 1st Photo-Electricians Company, in Trento (transferred from the 5th Engineer Regiment on 7 May 1955)

On 1 January 1964 the XX Engineer Battalion was renamed XIV Army Corps Engineer Battalion, and on 16 January the 2nd cableway company was merged into the 1st, while the 1st Mechanics-Electricians Company, 1st Photo-Electricians Company and 1st Camouflage Company of the 2nd Engineer Regiment were merged into a Mixed Company. On 29 February 1964 the regiment was disbanded on the next day the remaining units of the regiment entered the 2nd Engineer Regiment.

During the 1975 army reform the Italian Army disbanded the regimental level and newly independent battalions were granted for the first time their own flags. During the reform engineer battalions were named for a lake if they supported a corps or named for a river if they supported a division or brigade. On 31 December 1975 the 5th Engineer Regiment in Udine was disbanded and on 1 January 1976 the regiment's I Miners Battalion was renamed 1st Mining Engineer Battalion "Garda" and assigned the flag and traditions of the 1st Engineer Regiment and the traditions of the 1st Miners Regiment. The battalion was assigned to the 5th Army Corps' Engineer Command and consisted of a command, a command and park company, and three mining engineer companies.

For its conduct and work after the 1976 Friuli earthquake the battalion was awarded a Silver Medal of Army Valour, which was affixed to the battalion's flag.

In 1986 the command and park company split into a command and services company, and a special equipment company. On 31 March 1991 the battalion was disbanded and on 8 May 1991 the flag of the 1st Engineer Regiment was deposited at the Shrine of the Flags in the Vittoriano in Rome.

On 3 October 1993 the 4th Engineer Battalion "Orta" was disbanded and the next day the 1st Engineer Regiment was reformed with the personnel and materiel of the disbanded battalion. As the Orta held the flag of the 4th Engineer Regiment, the flag of the 1st Engineer Regiment was not retrieved from the Shrine of the Flags. On 13 October 1995 the 1st Engineer Regiment and 4th Engineer Battalion "Orta" were disbanded, and with their personnel, and the personnel of the 2nd Sappers Battalion "Iseo", the 2nd Engineer Regiment was reformed in Trento.

References 

Regiments of Italy in World War I
Regiments of Italy in World War II
Engineer Regiments of Italy
Military units and formations established in 1848